Hungary competed at the 1976 Winter Olympics in Innsbruck, Austria.

Figure skating

Men

Ice Dancing

References
Official Olympic Reports
International Olympic Committee results database
 Olympic Winter Games 1976, full results by sports-reference.com

Nations at the 1976 Winter Olympics
1976
Olympics